1-acyl-sn-glycerol-3-phosphate acyltransferase epsilon is an enzyme that in humans is encoded by the AGPAT5 gene.

This gene encodes a member of the 1-acylglycerol-3-phosphate O-acyltransferase family. This integral membrane protein converts lysophosphatidic acid to phosphatidic acid, the second step in de novo phospholipid biosynthesis.

References

External links

Further reading